Mr. George were a short-lived Australian rock and pop group. They formed in 1973 and released one studio album in 1974. They supported David Cassidy on his Australian tour in the early 1970s.

Members
 Alan Daniels – guitar
 George Fisher – bass
 Norm Irwin – vocals
 Richard Kett – drums
 Barry Rice – guitar
 Jackie Rice – vocals

Discography

Studio albums

Singles

References

Australian pop music groups
Musical groups established in 1973
Musical groups disestablished in 1975
Musical groups from Sydney